is a railway station located in the town of Ginan, Hashima District, Gifu Prefecture, Japan, operated by the private railway operator Meitetsu.

Lines

Station layout

Ginan Station has two ground-level opposed side platforms connected by an underpass. The station is unattended.

Platforms

Adjacent stations

History
It was renamed Ginan Station on 20 September 1980.

Surrounding area
Japan National Route 21

See also
 List of Railway Stations in Japan

References

External links

  

Railway stations in Japan opened in 1914
Stations of Nagoya Railroad
Railway stations in Gifu Prefecture
Ginan, Gifu